Animated Conversations is a series of short animated films by Aardman Animations.

List of shorts

 Animated Conversations: Down and Out (1977)
 Animated Conversations: Confessions of a Foyer Girl (1978)
 Animated Conversations: Sales Pitch (1983)
 Animated Conversations: On Probation (1983)

External links
 
 
 

BBC Television shows